The Acolin is a  long river in France. It is a left tributary of the Loire, which it meets near Decize. It flows through the departments of Allier and Nièvre.

Course
The Acolin has its source south of the town of Mercy (Allier) in a wooded area covered with many ponds. Its basin drains the area between the lower reaches of the Allier in the west and the Besbre to the east.

References

Rivers of France
Rivers of Allier
Rivers of Nièvre
Rivers of Auvergne-Rhône-Alpes
Rivers of Bourgogne-Franche-Comté